Forbidden (a.k.a. Scarlet Heaven ) is a 1949 British thriller film, produced and directed by George King, and starring Douglass Montgomery, Hazel Court and Patricia Burke. King's last production both as independent producer and as director, it also features the final screen appearance by Montgomery.

Plot summary
This thriller is set in Blackpool, where trained chemist Jim Harding (Douglass Montgomery) has been reduced to making a living peddling potions and medicines from a fairground stall with a former army colleague Dan Collins (Ronald Shiner).

Trapped in a loveless marriage with the vulgar, shrewish and domineering harpy, Diana (Patricia Burke), a woman who harbours ambitions of breaking into showbusiness, Jim finds himself attracted to the kinder working-class Jane Thompson (Hazel Court), who sells candyfloss and ice cream at an adjacent stall. Jim does not reveal to Jane that he is married as the two fall in love and begin an affair.  Diana meanwhile is engaged in a liaison of her own with the older Jerry Burns (Garry Marsh) who, she believes, will be able to help with her theatrical aspirations.

Diana finds out about Jim's affair and visits Jane at home. Diana reveals Jim's married status, tries to convince Jane that Jim is a serial philanderer and that she is only the latest in a succession of young women he has targeted, and offers her cash to end the relationship.  Jane refuses to be bought off and confronts Jim, who protests that he is caught in an intolerably unhappy marital situation with a selfish, unscrupulous woman. Jim then confronts Diana and demands a divorce, which she refuses out of hand.

In desperation, Jim determines that the only solution is to kill Diana.  Aware of her addiction to multiple medications, he uses his knowledge to concoct pills containing a lethal dose which he slips amongst her habitual supply.  Then, having second thoughts, he hurries home but finds Diana dead.  In a panic, he buries her body beneath the floorboards in his workshop, only to discover later when clearing up in the bedroom that the deadly pills he made up are untouched – Diana, in fact, has died of natural causes and his disposal of her body has been unnecessary and incriminating.

Diana's disappearance in unexplained circumstances arouses the suspicions of the police, who come to the conclusion that all the indications are that she has been murdered by her husband. Jim attempts to flee but is tracked down and chased through the streets of the town, where the final confrontation takes place at Blackpool Tower.

Cast
 Douglass Montgomery as Jim Harding
 Hazel Court as Jane Thompson
 Patricia Burke as Diana Harding
 Garry Marsh as Jerry Burns
 Ronald Shiner as Dan Collins
 Kenneth Griffith as Johnny
 Eliot Makeham as Pop Thompson
 Frederick Leister as Dr. Franklin
 Richard Bird as Jennings
 Michael Medwin as Cabby
 Andrew Cruickshank as Inspector Baxter
 Peggy Ann Clifford as Millie
 Peter Jones as Pete
 Erik Chitty as Schofield
 Sam Kydd as Joe

References

External links
 
 
 
 

1949 films
1940s thriller films
British black-and-white films
Films directed by George King
Films set in Blackpool
British thriller films
1940s English-language films
1940s British films